The Münden Nature Park lies within the district of Göttingen, in south Lower Saxony in Germany.

Geography 
This large and densely wooded  nature park was founded in 1959 within the borders of the now defunct district of Münden. It is just under  in area and runs almost from the eastern edge of the town of Kassel and border of Hesse in a northerly direction through the northern part of the Kaufungen Forest via Hann. Münden to the Bramwald and Dransfeld Town Forest. It lies south, east and northeast of the confluence of the Fulda and Werra rivers with the Weser and borders in the south and southeast on the Meißner-Kaufungen Forest Nature Park. It is crossed by the A 7 motorway.

Many footpaths criss-cross this forested landscape, including long-distance paths like the Frau Holle Path (Kennzeichnung X4), Werraburgensteig (X5), Studentenpfad (X13) and Fuldahöhenweg (X17). On the Großer Staufenberg there is a  glider airfield.

Hills 
The hills in the Münden Nature Park include (heights in metres above sea level (NN)):

Places of interest 

 Barefoot walk near Nienhagen
 Brackenburg, ruined castle on the Brackenberg near Scheden-Meensen
 Bramburg
 Hemeln − reaction ferry via the Weser to Veckerhagen with its beer garden Zur Fähre ("The Ferry")
 Hohen Hagen − Geology Path and Gauß Tower with its tower restaurant
 Hühnerfeld 
 Hühnerfeldberg
 Lippoldsburg
 Naturfreunde, NFH Steinberghaus near Großen Steinberg
 Rinderstall − deer enclosure with inn and small museum,
 Römerlager Hedemünden
 Sichelnstein, ruined castle
 Spiegelburg
 Steinrode, medieval model village of Steinrode near Steinberg youth hostel

See also 
 List of the nature parks in Germany

External links 
 
Münden Nature Park

Muenden
Protected areas established in 1959
1959 establishments in West Germany
Göttingen (district)